Robert Vane Russell (8 August 1873 – 30 December 1915) was a British civil servant, known for his role as Superintendent of Ethnography for what was then the Central Provinces of British India, coordinating the production of publications detailing the peoples of the region. Russell served as Superintendent of Census Operations for the 1901 Census of India.

Russell's father, Charles Robert Tilden Russell, was an officer in the Royal Navy. He was educated at Winchester College before attending Trinity College, Cambridge and then, in 1893, joining the Indian Civil Service.

Together with an amateur archaeologist, Rai Bahadur Hira Lal, Russell compiled The Castes and Tribes of the Central Provinces, published in 1916. This work was a product of the Ethnographic Survey of India that had been established in 1901, although it differed somewhat from earlier publications of similar origin because it relied more on Vedic literature than on the anthropometric methods and theories of Herbert Hope Risley and his sympathisers as a mechanism for investigation of the racial origins of caste. According to Crispin Bates, this "highly anecdotal book" was influenced by Émile Senart's Les Castes dans L'Inde and 

Russell died when the SS Persia was torpedoed and sank off the coast of Crete on 30 December 1915.

Works

References

External links

 
 

Indian Civil Service (British India) officers
British demographers
Central Provinces
1873 births
1915 deaths
British ethnographers
British anthropologists
19th-century British scientists
Civilians killed in World War I
People educated at Winchester College
Alumni of Trinity College, Cambridge
British people in colonial India